Wild Flowers is a Czech drama film released in 2000. It was directed by F. A. Brabec and based on seven poems from Kytice, a collection of ballads by Karel Jaromír Erben. While relatively successful commercially, the film was deplored by critics for its crude literalism of depiction.

Structure
The 7 stories are as follows:
 Kytice (Wild Flowers)
 Vodník (The Waterman, or The Water Goblin)
 Svatební košile (Wedding Shirts, or The Specter's Bride)
 Polednice (The Noon Witch)
 Zlatý kolovrat (The Golden Spinning Wheel)
 Dceřina kletba (The Daughter's Curse)
 Štědrý den (Christmas Eve)

Plot
A Film Story playing from spring to winter and covering 80 years of human life. Seven dramatic human life stories that may play anywhere and in any century. They tell the everlasting story of passion, love desire, obsession and selfishness.

The whole story, the Ballads were written by Czech poet Karel Jaromír Erben a century ago and yet they are still here and alive. Therefore, the authors of the movie decided to choose seven of the ballads and make them a film poetry of a very new style. It is a composition of photography, music and fascinating landscape and architecture.

The first ballad – Wild Flowers - is full of emotions and opens the whole world of different feelings and emotions of the human being as well as fairy tale creatures. It carries the name Bouquet and tells a story of little orphans crying for their mother . The mother hears their cries and prayers and comes back to them in the form of a little flower.
 
The Waterman is a fascinating slightly horror story about a waterman who falls in love with a country girl. Most of the scenes are shot really in the water and make this very authentic. It is again an eternal story about love, passion, different aspects of motherhood and discrimination.

The Noon-Day witch is tells of a desperate, tired mother and a greedy old noon witch. The mother is frustrated when her child is noisy and bothering her in every respect, therefore she calls the witch to give the boy a lesson - however she regrets her desperate deed immediately, its consequences are irretrievable.
 
The Wedding Dress is a romantic horror played between our world and the world of the dead.

The Daughter's Curse is in fact an unfortunate misunderstanding between two different generations. It deals again of the often complicated mother-daughter relationship, especially when the daughter is handicapped and the mother wants “the best” for the poor child. In the end the daughter cannot cope with the freedom and curses her mother.

The Golden Spinning Wheel is a colourful story about the confusing similarity of faces when characters are totally different. It is a great opportunity for one actress who plays both the good and the wicked girl. However the bad ones get punished and the good ones are rewarded as in any good fairy tale. The photography uses the beautiful colours of the fall and the beauty of the landscape.

The last ballad The Christmas Day is closing the circle of a human life in the person of an old woman who accepts her death as a natural ending of her life. She feels in peace with God and her fellow people and knows that she didn't live in vain.

The persons of individual stories keep meeting in between their ballads as on a merry-go round. It is a great poetry composed of pictures, music and words that accompanies us home and makes us ponder over the sense of life and death, love and hate, tolerance and discrimination, tenderness and wild passion for a long time.

Film awards
 Czech Lion awards 2000  • Best Photography  • Best Music • Best Sound Editing  • Best Poster 
 Rhode Island International Film Festival 2002  • Grand prize for best foreign film
 Wine Country Film Festival 2001  • Best photography
 Camerimage 2001  • Winner of World Panorama - Audience Competition

External links
 Wild Flowers Trailer
 Making of Wild Flowers
 Wild Flowers Soundtrack
 Wild Flowers official music video
 Wild Flowers - special shots - K. Roden
 Wild Flowers - special shots - Waterman
 Wild Flowers - special shots - Masques
 
 

2000 films
2000s horror drama films
2000s Czech-language films
Czech horror films
Czech drama films
Folk horror films
Films based on works by Karel Jaromír Erben
Czech Lion Awards winners (films)
2000 drama films
Films based on fairy tales
Czech anthology films